Pol Sara (also Romanized as Pol Sarā) is a village in Tameshkol Rural District, Nashta District, Tonekabon County, Mazandaran Province, Iran. At the 2006 census, its population was 1,090, in 296 families.

References 

Populated places in Tonekabon County